Lawrence Douglas Giroux (born August 28, 1951) is a Canadian former professional ice hockey defenceman.

Born in Weyburn, Saskatchewan, Giroux started his National Hockey League career with the St. Louis Blues in 1974. He also played for the Kansas City Scouts, Detroit Red Wings, and Hartford Whalers. He retired after the 1980 season. He was known as "the buffalo" for his 1970s-styled hair and side burns. Commonly referred to as "Buff".

Career statistics

Regular season and playoffs

External links

1951 births
Living people
Canadian ice hockey defencemen
Denver Spurs players
Des Moines Oak Leafs players
Detroit Red Wings players
Fort Worth Wings players
Fransaskois people
Hartford Whalers players
Ice hockey people from Saskatchewan
Kansas City Blues players
Kansas City Red Wings players
Kansas City Scouts players
New Haven Nighthawks players
Salt Lake Golden Eagles (CHL) players
Sportspeople from Weyburn
Springfield Indians players
St. Louis Blues players
Swift Current Broncos players
Undrafted National Hockey League players
Virginia Wings players
Weyburn Red Wings players